Nils Schouterden (born 14 December 1988) is a Belgian football player who plays for Lierse Kempenzonen.

References

External links

1988 births
Association football midfielders
Living people
Belgian footballers
Belgian expatriate footballers
Belgium youth international footballers
Oud-Heverlee Leuven players
Sint-Truidense V.V. players
K.A.S. Eupen players
K.V.C. Westerlo players
K.V. Mechelen players
AEK Larnaca FC players
Lierse Kempenzonen players
Challenger Pro League players
Belgian Pro League players
Footballers from Flemish Brabant
Expatriate footballers in Cyprus
Sportspeople from Leuven
Belgian expatriate sportspeople in Cyprus